Frank Norris Graves (November 2, 1860 - March 23, 1916)  was a baseball catcher and manager.

Graves played for the St. Louis Maroons in 1886, leading the league in the dubious category of passed balls with 81, despite only playing in 43 games.

He managed the minor league Detroit Tigers in 1897 and 1898.

References

External links

1860 births
Detroit Tigers managers
St. Louis Maroons players
St. Paul Apostles players
Columbus Stars (baseball) players
Kansas City Cowboys (minor league) players
Buffalo Bisons (minor league) players
Minneapolis Millers (baseball) players
Sacramento Altas players
Macon Central City players
Memphis Giants players
19th-century baseball players
1916 deaths